This is a list of 10 historic sites in Windsor, California which have been designated as sites on the Town of Windsor Historic Register by Windsor's town council.

There are a number of historic places in Windsor.

Windsor has a local historical society, the Windsor Historical Society, which was founded in 1959 and operates a local history museum. The society publishes a local history walking tour guide.

Sonoma County, California designates historic landmarks in unincorporated areas outside towns and cities of the county.

There is one historic site in Windsor which is listed on the National Register of Historic Places: the Cunningham-Hembree Estate, which was listed in 2018. 

There are two historic sites near Windsor which were designated by Sonoma County and by the National Register of Historic Places: the Mount Weske Stables, just outside the north border of Windsor, and the James H. and Frances E. Laughlin House, south of Windsor.

Windsor historical landmarks

See also
  National Register of Historic Places listings in Sonoma County, California
  List of cemeteries in California

Notes

References

Windsor, California
History of Sonoma County, California